Jonathan Bridge (born 1966 in Manchester) is an English actor.

Selected filmography
 Brassed Off (1996)
 The Navigators (2001)
 Vacuuming Completely Nude in Paradise (2001)
 Asylum (2005)
 Sherlock Holmes (2009)
 The Road to Coronation Street (TV) (2010)
 Job Culture (also writer and director) (2011)
 '71 (2014)
 Reg TV Movie (2016)
 The Witness for the prosecution TV Mini Series (2016)

External links

1966 births
Male actors from Manchester
Living people
English male film actors
English male television actors